

Amusement rides based on video games franchises
This is a list of former and operating amusement park rides based on specific video games or video game franchises.

References

Amusement rides based on video game franchises
Film franchises
Video game franchises
Video game lists